Aston Villa played the  1933–34 English football season in the Football League First Division.  Billy Smith remained trophy-less going into his eighth season. Jimmy McMullan was appointed as manager when Billy Smith retired in May 1934.

On 30 December 1933, Villa drew 1–1 away Leicester City, Dai Astley equalizing in the final seconds of the game.

League table

Squad statistics

Appearances
Ronnie Dix 48 appearances 
Harry Morton, 48 appearances, conceded 86
Eric Houghton, 47 appearances
Dai Astley, 44 appearances
Joe Nibloe, 40 appearances
Arthur Cunliffe 39 appearances
Danny Blair, 38 appearances
Billy Kingdon, 37 appearances
Alec Talbot, 33 appearances
Jimmy Gibson, 28 appearances
Pongo Waring, 28 appearances
Joe Beresford, 27 appearances
Tommy Wood, 20 appearances
Tommy Mort, 16 appearances
Tommy Gardner, 12 appearances
Billy Simpson, 11 appearances
George Brown, 6 appearances
Jack Mandley, 6 appearances
Billy Walker, 5 appearances
Bob Brocklebank, 3 appearances
Reg Chester, 2 appearances
Teddy Bowen, 2 appearances
Ernie Callaghan 2 appearances
Joe Tate, 1 appearance

References

Aston Villa F.C. seasons
Aston Villa F.C. season